Andrew Asiamah Amoako (24 February 1966) is a Ghanaian lawyer, politician and member of the Eighth Parliament of the Fourth Republic of Ghana, elected to office in December 2020 as an independent candidate. He currently represents the Fomena Constituency in the Ashanti Region. He is also the Second Deputy Speaker of Parliament.

Early life and education 
Amoako was born on 24 February 1966 at Wioso-Adansi in the Ashanti Region. He holds an MSc in Environmental Resources Management, Master of Arts in Conflict Resolution and an LLB (Law) from the Kwame Nkrumah University of Science and Technology and a professional law licence (BL) from the Ghana School of Law.

Career 
Before entering politics, he was a legal practitioner at the Minka Premo and Co. (Akosombo Chambers). He was the Estates Officer, Land Officer and Valuer at the Kumasi Metro Assembly.

Politics 
After deciding not to contest in the party's primaries prior to the 2020 general elections due to the unfair treatment he received from his own party, he decided to run as an independent candidate. He had been a member of the New Patriotic Party (NPP), which, citing Article 3(9) of its constitution, revoked his membership and notified the Speaker of Parliament, who duly declared his seat vacant on 13 October 2020 under the provisions of Article 97 (1)g of the Constitution. Amoako objected on the grounds that being expelled from the party did not mean he was no longer a member of parliament, and that only the Parliament of Ghana could revoke his position as an elected MP. Legal practitioner Kwaku Asare agreed with Amoako, arguing that such a decision is a legal matter which falls under the jurisdiction of the High Court, as specified by Article 99(1) of the Constitution.

Amoako won the Fomena parliamentary seat during the December 2020 elections with 12,805 votes, defeating his main opponent, his former party's Philip Ofori-Asante, who secured 10,798 votes. Amoako became the only independent candidate to win in the 2020 parliamentary elections. His position as an independent member of parliament became even more significant after the elections given that neither of the two main political parties (NPP and National Democratic Congress) could secure an outright majority. In a post-election interview, Amoako indicated that he had no ill-feelings towards the NPP over the termination of his party membership. The General Secretary of the NPP, John Boadu, has suggested that Amoako could reapply for his NPP membership subject to specific party regulations and conditions. On 7 January 2021, Asiamah was elected as the Second Deputy Speaker of Parliament. He is the only independent member of parliament to have been elected to that position in the history of Ghana.

Committees 
Amoako is the chairperson of the Members Holding Offices of Profit Committee, a member of the Standing Orders Committee, a member of the Subsidiary Legislation Committee, a member of the Education Committee and a member of the Mines and Energy Committee.

Personal life 
Amoako is a Christian.

References 

Ghanaian MPs 2017–2021
1966 births
Living people
New Patriotic Party politicians
Ghanaian MPs 2021–2025
Ghanaian Roman Catholics